Astragalus brachycalyx, the Persian manna or manna, whose name is derived from the Latin ‘brachy’ meaning short, and ‘calyx’ referring to the sepal of the flower, is a species of legume commonly found on rocky mountain slopes in western Asia, from western Iran and northern Iraq to Turkey, and is commonly used as a source of gum tragacanth.

References

brachycalyx
Plants described in 1843
Flora of Western Asia
Flora of Iraq